Harvard is an unincorporated community in the northwest United States, on the Palouse of north central Idaho in Latah County.

History
Harvard was founded in 1906 when the Washington, Idaho and Montana Railway was extended to that point. The community was named after Harvard University, and its post office has been in operation  since 1906.

The railroad slated it to be called "Canfield" after landowner Homer Canfield, who did not want the honor.

Other locations in the vicinity with collegiate names include Cornell, Purdue, Stanford, Vassar, Wellesley, and Yale. Some were intended, others were coincidental.

Harvard's population was estimated at 200 in 1909, and was 50 in 1960.

References

External links

 Dearest Maude –  About Harvard, Idaho
 Camp Grizzly –  Boy Scouts of America, Inland Northwest Council
 Video (2010)

Unincorporated communities in Latah County, Idaho
Unincorporated communities in Idaho